Grease: The Original Soundtrack from the Motion Picture is the original motion picture soundtrack for the 1978 film Grease. It was originally released by RSO Records and subsequently re-issued by Polydor Records between 1984 and 1991.  It has sold over 30 million copies worldwide, making it one of the best-selling albums of all time, also ranking amongst the biggest selling soundtrack albums of all time. The song "You're the One That I Want" was a US and UK No. 1 for stars John Travolta and Olivia Newton-John.

Besides performers John Travolta and Olivia Newton-John, the album also featured songs by rock and roll revival group Sha Na Na as well as the hit song "Grease", a tune written by Barry Gibb (of the Bee Gees) and sung by Frankie Valli (of The Four Seasons) that was an additional US number one.

Background
The soundtrack was released on April 14, 1978, two months ahead of the film's release. As with most musicals of the period, the vocal takes recorded for the album release–and in some cases the instrumental background as well–do not lock to picture but were recorded during entirely different soundtrack sessions often months prior or subsequent to the performances used for lip sync in the film.

The cover gives credit to, and prominently features, the two stars of the film—John Travolta and Olivia Newton-John—although they only appear on seven of the 24 tracks. Sha Na Na performed many of the 1950s numbers in the film, the recordings of which also appear on the soundtrack. Stockard Channing sings lead on two of the tracks; the two tracks remain her only significant contribution to recorded popular music to date. The title track (which is featured twice on the soundtrack, at the beginning and end) was recorded by Frankie Valli, who had no other connection with the film.

The entirety of the score written by Jim Jacobs and Warren Casey for the Broadway musical was included on the soundtrack and/or in the film, with the exception of two songs: "Shakin' at the High School Hop" (originally composed to open Act II of the musical) and "All Choked Up" (the song originally written into the spot where the film used "You're the One that I Want") were both left out of both the film and the soundtrack. Not all of the songs were included in the film; songs cut from the film were performed on the soundtrack by Louis St. Louis and Cidny (then Cindy) Bullens or converted to instrumentals. Songs in the musical that were not performed by Rizzo, Danny, Sandy, the Teen Angel, or Johnny Casino & the Gamblers were given to those characters or to St. Louis and Bullens; these included Sandy's original feature number "It's Raining on Prom Night" (given to Bullens and used as a jukebox background song), Marty's "Freddy, My Love" (given to Bullens), Doody's "Those Magic Changes" (given to Johnny Casino & the Gamblers), Kenickie's "Greased Lightnin'" (given to Danny), and both of the songs originally attributed to a character named Roger that was written out of the film, "Mooning" and "Rock'n'Roll Party Queen" (both given to St. Louis; "Mooning" was replaced in function in the film by the 1930s standard "Blue Moon," performed by the Gamblers). Rizzo's 11 o'clock number "There Are Worse Things I Could Do" was only kept in the film at Channing's fervent insistence, as she felt the song (and the storyline behind it) was necessary to prevent Rizzo from becoming a one-dimensional caricature.

The most successful songs from the soundtrack were written specifically for the film. They included the Billboard number-one hits "Grease", "You're the One That I Want" and the Academy Award-nominated "Hopelessly Devoted to You". In the UK, the album proved even more successful where "You're the One That I Want" and "Summer Nights" (a song carried over from the original musical) reached No.1 for nine and seven weeks respectively, while "Grease", "Hopelessly Devoted to You" and "Sandy" all became top three hits. The soundtrack album hit the top of the charts in the US during the summer of 1978, replacing The Rolling Stones' Some Girls. In the UK, it remained at the top of the charts for 13 consecutive weeks. As of 2011, "You're the One That I Want" and "Summer Nights" are still among the 20 best-selling singles of all time in the UK (at Nos.6 and 19 respectively). "Greased Lightnin'," another carryover from the stage version, was also released as a single, reaching the top 20 in the UK but narrowly missing the top 40 in the US in part because of the lyrical content not being permitted on US radio.

Two of the bass players who recorded on the Grease soundtrack were (at different times) members of Toto. One of these, David Hungate, also performed on Olivia Newton-John's album Totally Hot with Toto guitarist Steve Lukather. Other musicians on the soundtrack had previously worked with Elton John, Steely Dan, Bee Gees and others. The Grease album, as well as the soundtrack for the film, were recorded and mixed by David J. Holman.

The album has sold over 6 million copies in the US in the SoundScan era (beginning 1991) in addition to the 8 million shipped in the years 1978–1984.

Reception

Stephen Thomas Erlewine of AllMusic retrospectively rated the soundtrack four-and-a-half stars. He stated that "the originals hold up better than the '50s tunes" due in large part to Sha Na Na's workmanlike performances of the latter. Erlewine added however that the original songs "are so giddily enjoyable that everything works". He also said that "the sleek pop production the movie's soundtrack boasts and the cast's enthusiastic performances go a long way in making this Grease the definitive Grease." The album was nominated for Album of the Year at the 21st Annual Grammy Awards.

Track listing

Side one

Side two

Side three

Side four

CD release
The CD of the soundtrack has been released twice in the US. In April 1991 it was released through Polydor Records as a single disc replicating the sequence of the original 1978 RSO LP. In September 2003 it was released by PolyGram as a 2-CD digitally-remastered "Deluxe Edition" containing additional tracks.
As with the LP and single-disc CD, the songs are not presented in the order replicating their appearances in the movie.

40th anniversary vinyl reissue
In August 2018, Polydor reissued the vinyl album to celebrate its original release in 1978. Released on 180g vinyl and mastered in half speed, it was the first time since its original release that it had used the original RSO record label in the artwork. No information was provided on who or where the record was half speed mastered.

Performers

Vocalists
Olivia Newton-John – vocals
John Travolta – vocals
Stockard Channing – vocals ("Look At Me, I'm Sandra Dee", "There Are Worse Things I Could Do")
Frankie Valli – vocals ("Grease")
Barry Gibb – vocals ("Grease")
Frankie Avalon - vocals ("Beauty School Drop Out")
Background vocals: Curt Becher, Paulette K. Brown, Cindy Bullens, Beau Charles, Carol Chase, Kerry Chater, Loren Farber, John Farrar, Venetta Fields, Gerald Garrett, Jim Gilstrap, Mitch Gordon, Jim Haas, Patty Henderson, Ron Hicklin, Diana Lee, John Lehman, Maxayn Lewis, Melissa MacKay, Myrna Matthews, Marti McCall, Gene Merlino, Gene Morford, Lisa Roberts, Sally Stevens, Zedrick Turnbough, Jackie Ward, M. Ann White, Jerry Whitman

Musicians
Drums: Ollie E. Brown, Carlos Vega, Cubby O'Brien, Ron Ziegler
Bass: Mike Porcaro, David Hungate, Max Bennett, David Allen Ryan, Wm. J. Bodine, Dean Cortez, Harold Cowart
Guitar: John Farrar, Tim May ("Born to Hand Jive"), Jay Graydon, Lee Ritenour, Dan Sawyer, Bob Rose, Dennis Budimir, Tommy Tedesco, Cliff Morris, Joey Murcia, Peter Frampton ("Grease"), George Terry ("Grease")
Keyboards: Louis St. Louis, Greg Mathieson, Michael Lang, Lincoln Mayorga, Thomas Garvin, Ben Lanzarone, George Bitzer
Saxophone: Ray Pizzi ("We Go Together" & "Greased Lightnin'"), Ernie Watts ("There Are Worse Things I Could Do" and "Alone at a Drive-In Movie"), Jerome Richardson, John Kelson, Jr.
Trumpet: Albert Aarons, Robert Bryant
Trombone: Lloyd Ulyate
Percussion: Eddie "Bongo" Brown, Larry Bunker, Victor Feldman, Antoine Dearborn
Harp: Dorothy Remsen, Gayle Levant
Concertmaster: James Getzoff
Contractor: Carl Fortina
Copyist: Bob Borenstein

Production
All selections except "Grease" arranged by: John Farrar, Michael Gibson, Louis St. Louis
Strings on "Summer Nights" arranged by Ben Lanzarone
Horns and Strings on "Greased Lightnin'" and "Born to Hand Jive" arranged by Michael Melvoin
 Karl Richardson – engineer ("Grease")
Recorded at: Filmways/Wally Heider Recording Studios, HollywoodUnited Western Studios, HollywoodHollywood Sound Recorders, Hollywood
Engineered by: David J. Holman, Jay Lewis, EirBilly Joel Wangberg, Michael Carneval, Karl Richardson ("Grease")
All selections mixed and re-mixed by David J. Holman at Filmways/Wally Heider Recording Studios, Hollywood (Except "Grease")
Produced by: Louis St. Louis and John Farrar; Barry Gibb, Albhy Galuten and Karl Richardson ("Grease")
Album mastered at A&M Records by Bernie Grundman
Art direction: Glenn Ross
Album design: Tim Bryant/George Corsillo
Photography: Alan Pappe/Lee Gross Assoc., Inc.
Background photos: Ron Slenzak

Charts

Weekly charts

Year-end charts

Sales and certifications

See also
 List of best-selling albums
 List of best-selling albums by country
 List of best-selling albums in Australia
 List of best-selling albums in France
 List of best-selling albums in Germany
 List of best-selling albums in the United Kingdom
 List of diamond-certified albums in Canada

References

Albums produced by John Farrar
Musical film soundtracks
Olivia Newton-John soundtracks
1978 soundtrack albums
RSO Records soundtracks
Polydor Records soundtracks
Grease (musical)
Various artists albums